Methylobacterium gossipiicola  is a Gram-negative, aerobic, facultatively methylotrophic bacteria from the genus of Methylobacterium which has been isolated from cotton in Coimbatore in India.

References

Further reading

External links
Type strain of Methylobacterium gossipiicola at BacDive -  the Bacterial Diversity Metadatabase

Hyphomicrobiales
Bacteria described in 2012